opened in Nara, Japan, in 1984.

See also
 Nara National Museum

References

External links

  Nakano Museum of Art

Museums in Nara, Nara
Art museums and galleries in Japan
Museums established in 1984
1984 establishments in Japan